Esse quam videri is a Latin phrase meaning "To be, rather than to seem." It and variants have been used as a motto by a number of different groups. The form Esse, non Videri ("to act, not to seem to be") is the Wallenberg family motto.

History
Esse quam videri is found in Cicero's essay On Friendship (Laelius de Amicitia, chapter 98). Virtute enim ipsa non tam multi praediti esse quam videri volunt ("Few are those who wish to be endowed with virtue rather than to seem so").

Just a few years after Cicero, Sallust used the phrase in his Bellum Catilinae (54.6), writing that Cato the Younger esse quam videri bonus malebat ("He preferred to be good rather than to seem so").

Previous to both Romans, Aeschylus used a similar phrase in Seven Against Thebes at line 592, at which the scout (angelos) says of the seer/priest Amphiaraus:  (ou gàr dokeîn áristos, all' eînai thélei: "he doesn't want to seem, but to be the bravest"). Plato quoted this line in Republic (361b).

Usage as a motto

North Carolina

Esse quam videri is the state motto of North Carolina, adopted in 1893.

Schools and colleges
Esse quam videri is (or was) the motto of a number of schools and colleges around the world, including:
Academia de Guerra del Ejército de Chile, Santiago, Chile
Academy of the Holy Names, Tampa, Florida
Academy of the Holy Names, Albany, New York
Academy at the Lakes, Land O Lakes, Florida
Accra Academy, Accra, Ghana
Albert Academy, Freetown, Sierra Leone
Amarillo High School, Amarillo, Texas
St Anselm's School, Bakewell, England
St Audries School, East Quantoxhead, Somerset, England
Appalachian State University (1899), Boone, North Carolina
Ashford School (1899), Ashford, Kent, England
Ashville College (1877), Harrogate, England
Augusta Preparatory Day School (1972), Augusta, Georgia, USA
Bedford College, University of London until c.1990, when Bedford and Royal Holloway Colleges merged and it became the motto of the joint college
Berklee College of Music, Boston, Massachusetts, USA and Valencia, Spain
Bordentown Military Institute, (1881-1973), Bordentown, NJ, USA
Boys' Latin School of Maryland (1844), Baltimore, Maryland, USA
Brigham Young University Men's Chorus, Provo, Utah, USA
Chania High School, Thika, Kenya
Clifton House Preparatory School, Harrogate, England
Colyton Grammar School (1546), Colyford, England
Columbia College Chicago (1890), Chicago, Illinois, USA
Connells Point Public School, Sydney, Australia
Cranbrook School, Sydney (1918), Sydney, Australia
Darwin High School, Darwin, Australia
Desert Heights Preparatory Academy, Glendale, Arizona
Dubbo High School (now Dubbo College)
Ellis Robins High School, Harare, Zimbabwe
The Ellis School, Pittsburgh, Pennsylvania, USA
The Episcopal Academy, Newtown Square, Pennsylvania, USA
Esquimalt High School, Esquimalt, British Columbia
The Forest School, Winnersh, Wokingham, Berkshire, England
Garrison Forest School, Owings Mills, Maryland, USA
Groton School (1884), Groton, Massachusetts, USA. The motto changed to Cui Servire est Regnare ("To whom to serve is to reign") shortly after the school's founding.
Hartford Public High School, Hartford, Connecticut, USA
The Hemel Hempstead School (1931), Hemel Hempstead, England.
The Hermitage School (1906), Geelong, Australia; which has subsequently become that of The Hermitage House, Geelong Grammar School.
Highsted Grammar School, Sittingbourne, Kent, England
Homewood School, Tenterden, Kent, England
Hudson Catholic High School, Hudson, Massachusetts
Instituto Metodista Bennett (1888), Rio de Janeiro, Brazil
JMA Armstrong High School, Salisbury, New Brunswick, Canada
John Caldwell School, Grand Falls, New Brunswick, Canada
The King's College, New York (House of Susan B. Anthony)
Kingsley School, Leamington Spa, Warwickshire, England
Kutama College, Norton, Zimbabwe
Lane College, Jackson, Tennessee, USA
Magee Secondary School, Vancouver, British Columbia
Miami Coral Park Senior High School, Miami, Florida, USA
Montego Bay High School for Girls, Jamaica
Montreat College, Montreat, North Carolina
Moravian Academy, Bethlehem, Pennsylvania; current motto is "mind, body, spirit",
Mountlake Terrace High School, Mountlake Terrace, Washington
National University of Health Sciences (previously National Chiropractic College), Lombard, Illinois
Peace College (1857), Raleigh, North Carolina, USA
Providence Christian Academy, Murfreesboro, Tennessee
Queen's College, Queenstown, South Africa
Regent's University London, England
Rhodesway School (1958), Bradford, UK
Rockridge Secondary School, West Vancouver, British Columbia
Royal Holloway, University of London, Egham, Surrey, England
Salisbury School, Salisbury, Connecticut, USA
Selaiyur Hall, Madras Christian College, Chennai, India
Seton Hall High School, Patchogue, New York, United States
Southampton Grammar School for Girls Southampton, UK
St Audries School, West Quantoxhead, Taunton, Somerset, England (since closed and now a hotel)
St Francis Xaviers Kutama College (1914), Norton, Zimbabwe
St Thomas à Becket Catholic Secondary School, Wakefield, West Yorkshire, United Kingdom
St. Joseph's College in Patchogue, New York, United States.
St. Malachy's Memorial High School, Saint John, New Brunswick, Canada.
St. Peter's School, Mazgaon, Mumbai, India
Stanley Clark School, South Bend, Indiana, USA
Streetsville Secondary School, Streetsville, Mississauga, Ontario, Canada
Suffield Academy, Suffield, Connecticut, USA
The Taieri High School, Mosgiel, Otago, New Zealand
Thomas Jefferson Classical Academy (1999–present), Rutherford County, North Carolina
Trevecca Nazarene University, Nashville, Tennessee
Truro School (1880–present), Truro, Cornwall, England
University of North Carolina at Charlotte (1946), Charlotte, North Carolina, USA
University of Tampa, Tampa, Florida
Villa Devoto School (1908), Buenos Aires, Argentina
Wavell State High School, Brisbane, Australia
Woodward Career Technical High School (formerly Woodward High School), Cincinnati, Ohio, USA
Wyomissing Area Junior/Senior High School, Wyomissing, Pennsylvania
Yeovil School, Yeovil, Somerset, England

Sororities
Esse quam videri is the motto of the following sororities:
Delta Phi Epsilon sorority, founded in 1917 at New York University Law School.
 House of Susan B. Anthony, founded exclusively at The King's College NYC.
 Phi Delta Alpha, founded in 2002 at University of Oklahoma
 Alpha Chi Lambda, founded in 1998 at Trinity University in San Antonio, TX.

Fraternities
Esse quam videri is the motto of the following fraternities:
Phi Gamma Nu, National Professional Fraternity in Business, est. Northwestern University 1924.
Lambda Kappa Sigma, founded in 1913 at Massachusetts College of Pharmacy.
Phi Beta Fraternity, National Professional Association for the Creative and Performing Arts,  founded in 1912 at Northwestern University.
Gamma Eta Gamma, founded in  1901 at the University of Maine School of Law. The only remaining chapter exists at the University of Minnesota Law School.

Sporting organisations
Kingswood Rugby Football Club, Bristol, UK, use a variant Esse Non Videri as their club motto.
 White Wolves MC, Oradea, RO, use a variant of the motto, Esse Quam Videri Malim as their club motto.
 Outcast Cyclists, U.K. and worldwide use Esse Quam Videri as their club motto.

Companies
Brepols Publishers, as found on their older books: Melius esse quam videri
Swire Group esp. its shipping branch, The China Navigation Company.
The phrase is found on the Sibley Mill along the Augusta Canal in Augusta, Georgia. The structure was completed in 1882 and operated until 2006.
The phrase is found on the bottom of bottles of gin from the Isle of Harris, Scotland.

Other organizations
Esse quam videri is also the motto of
 the honor society The Order of Scroll and Key at Dickinson College.
 The honor society The Society of 1910 at The University of Southern Mississippi
The Archon Society at Kenyon College.
 The National Honor & Merit Scholars Society.
 Boy Scouts of America Troop 56 in Jersey City New Jersey
 the Carolina Wilderness EMS Externship, a wilderness EMS training program based in western North Carolina.
 the Brigham Young University Men's Chorus.
No. 77 Squadron RAF (active during three periods between 1916 and 1963) used the variant, Esse potius quam videri with the same meaning.
 The U. S. Consortium of Metropolitan Medical Directors (Eagles).
The Pan Hellenic Society of Silliman University, Philippines.
 In the 2017 film Only the Brave, the saying is stated to be the motto of the Granite Mountain Hotshots. The phrase is the motto of the Eric Marsh Foundation for Wildland Firefighters. 
 Royal Charter

Popular culture
Television personality Stephen Colbert inverted the statement on his show The Colbert Report to Videri Quam Esse, meaning "to seem to be rather than to be." It is also engraved across the faux hearth, above the video fireplace, in his studio, under his portrait.

The funk metal band Mordred features a song called Esse quam videri on their 1991 album In This life.

In the novel The Night Circus by Erin Morgenstern, Esse quam videri is a motto of the Bowen family.

In the novel Plain Bad Heroines by Emily M. Danforth, Esse quam videri is the motto of the defunct boarding school Brookhants.

References

External link

Latin mottos
Symbols of North Carolina
State mottos of the United States